A banya is originally a Russian steam bath with a wood stove. It is considered an important part of Russian culture. The bath takes place in a small room or building designed for dry or wet heat sessions. The steam and high heat make the bathers perspire. Genders were traditionally segregated in the banya, with separate rooms for the sexes.

In the Russian language, the word banya may also refer to a public bathhouse, the most historically famous being the Sanduny (Sandunovskie bani).

History 
A mention of the banya is found in the Radziwiłł Chronicle in the story of Princess Olga's revenge for the murder of her husband, Prince Igor, by the Slavic tribe of Drevlians in 945 AD. The leader of the Drevlians had hopes of marrying the widow Olga and sent messengers to discuss the idea. "When the Drevlians arrived, Olga commanded that a bath should be made ready for them and said, 'Wash yourselves and come to me.' The bath-house was heated and the unsuspecting Drevlians entered and began to wash themselves. [Olga's] men closed the bath-house behind them and Olga gave orders to set it on fire from the doors, so that the Drevlians were all burned to death."

An early description of the banya comes from the East Slavic Primary Chronicle of 1113. According to the Chronicle, or as it was called by its authors, The Tale of Bygone Years, the Apostle Andrew visited the territories that were later to become Russia and Ukraine during his visit to the Greek colonies on the Black Sea. Supposedly the belief was held that Andrew crossed through East Slavic lands from the mouth of the Dnieper River, past the hills on which Kiev would later be founded, and went as far north as the ancient city of Novgorod.

"Wondrous to relate," said he, "I saw the land of the Slavs, and while I was among them, I noticed their wooden bathhouses. They warm them to extreme heat, then undress, and after anointing themselves with tallow, they take young reeds and lash their bodies. They actually lash themselves so violently that they barely escape alive. Then they drench themselves with cold water, and thus are revived. They think nothing of doing this every day, and actually inflict such voluntary torture on themselves. They make of the act not a mere washing but a veritable torment."

The original bathhouses were detached, low-lying wooden structures dependent on a fire lit inside to provide heat. A stove in a corner is made of large round stones that, when heated, are lifted with iron rods and placed in a wooden tub. Once the fire is built, the bather then removes the fire and flushes out the smoke before beginning the bath. Hence the soot and the term "black bathhouses" (chernaya banya).

The Portuguese António Nunes Ribeiro Sanches, court physician in Russia, acquainted western physicians with the effects of  through his 1779

Cultural significance in Russian culture 
Since ancient times, the banya has been considered an important bonding place in Russian culture. Throughout Russian history, the banya was used by all social classes within Russian society, including villagers and nobles.  Communal baths were very common in villages and towns. It is also currently used as a place where Russian businesspeople and politicians meet.

Construction 

Banya buildings can be quite large with a number of different bathing areas or simple wooden cabins like the traditional Finnish cottage saunas. Russian banyas usually have three rooms: a steam room, a washing room and an entrance room. The entrance room, called a predbannik (предбанник) or pre-bath, has pegs to hang clothing upon and benches to rest on. The washing room has a hot water tap, which uses water heated by the steam room stove and a vessel or tap for cold water to mix water of a comfortable temperature for washing. The heater has three compartments: a fire box that is fed from the entrance room, the rock chamber, which has a small hole to throw the water into and a water tank at the top. The top of the water tank is usually closed to prevent vapour from infiltrating the banya. Water from a bucket by the stove is poured over the heated rocks in the stove. There are wooden benches across the room. People enter the steam room when the stove is hot, but before water is poured on the rocks. Getting a good sweat is thought to protect and condition the skin from the steam.

Black banyas and white banyas 
In a "black banya" (or, more precisely, "black-way", по-чёрному, po-chyornomu), the smoke escapes through a hole in the ceiling, while in "white banyas" ("white-way", по-белому, po-belomu) there are exhaust pipes to vent the smoke. In the former, the escaping smoke darkens the banyas interior wood. Both styles are characterized by boulder stones, clay balls and large cauldrons for the hot water as well as stone stoves with a tank to heat the water. The firewood is usually birch. A black banya is more rudimentary than a white banya.

Pokhodnaya or hiking banyas 

The pokhodnaya banya (походная баня) or "hiking banya", is popular among the Russian military, mountaineers and people who travel for extended periods in harsh environments. It consists of a stone oven set up in a small makeshift tent. Hiking banyas are usually made near a lakeshore or riverbank where many big, round stones are available to build the banyas oven and there is plenty of cool water available for bathing. Large stones are made into a dome-shaped circular oven, one to four meters in diameter and a half to one meter in height so that there is space left on the inside to make a large fire. Firewood is burned for several hours in this improvised stove until the stones on the surface of the pile become so hot that water poured on them turns into steam. Around the pile, a space is tarped to form a small tent and the banya is ready when it becomes very hot inside and there is a lot of steam. Fresh veniks (see "Bathing ritual" below) can be cut from nearby birch or oak trees and bathers can take turns cooling off in the ice-cold mountain water.

Bathing ritual 

Banya temperatures often will exceed , and felt or wool hats are typically worn to protect the head from this intense heat and hair from heating to a point that might cause burns on contact. It is common to sit on a small mat brought into the banya to protect bare skin from the hot wood and nails of the interior benches, and for hygienic reasons. In Russia, special felt hats are commonly sold in sets with felt mitts, along with extracts for inclusion into the steam water. Use of homemade herb extracts and beer is common. Dried wormwood may be hung over walls as well. Bunches of dried branches and leaves from white birch, oak or eucalyptus (called  banny venik, банный веник, "banya besom") are commonly used for massage and to facilitate heat transfer from hot air to body. The dried branches are moistened with very hot water before use. Sometimes in summer, fresh branches are used instead. Sometimes instead of drying the venik, it is frozen in the summer when it has fresh leaves and then thawed before use. In the central European Jewish baths long brushes made of rafia, known as Schmeis, were used in place of birch twigs.

After the first sweat is induced, it is customary to cool off in the breeze outdoors or splash around in cold water in a lake or river. In the winter, people may roll in the snow with no clothes on or dip in lakes where holes have been cut into the ice. Then the banya is re-entered and small amounts of water are splashed on the rocks. If too much water is used at once, the steam will be cool with a clammy feel. A small amount of water on sufficiently hot rocks will evaporate quickly, producing a steam consisting of small vapor particles. Waving the venik causes convective heat. The second sweat is commonly the first time venik is used, but some people wait until the third session.

After each sweat, cooling off is repeated and patrons use the break to drink beer, tea, or other beverages, play games or relax in good company in an antechamber to the steam room. Banyas might have a bar for people to have drinks and sometimes light meals afterwards.

Banyas and Eastern Slavic mythology 

In Slavic mythology, specifically East Slavic mythology every banya is inhabited by the Slavic bathhouse spirit Bannik. He is described as a wizened little man with wild white hair and a long, straggly beard, long nails and hairy hands. He lives behind the stove and his temperament is supposed to be very capricious. Because of the dimmed light in the banya, he was sometimes considered even to be malicious. It was said that by anger he could throw boiling water or even burn down the bathroom. He likes spying on bathers, particularly undressed women. He has the ability to predict the future. One consulted him by standing with one's back exposed in the half-open door of the bath. If the future predicts good, he strokes the back lovingly, by bad prospects he grabs the back with his claws.

Comparison with thermal bathing in other cultures

Ancient Roman thermae 

Ancient Romans had a cult of bathhouse. Greeting each other they said: "How is your sweating?" In the bathhouse they not only washed themselves, but socialized, painted, read poetry, sang, and feasted. Their bathhouses had special rooms for massage, gyms, and libraries. Wealthy citizens went to the bathhouse twice a day. Both private and public baths were distinguished by exceptional luxury – swimming pools were made of precious marble, silver and gold were used to decorate sinks. By the first century BC there were around 150 thermae in Rome. Steam rooms were heated in the same way as Russian banyas and Finnish saunas: the oven was placed in the corner, stones were laid on a bronze frame over red-hot charcoal. Rooms with wet and dry steam were also available. Hot air came through a pipe under the floor. The structure of thermae was complex: there were 5 rooms: a room for undressing and resting after bathing, a swimming pool for the first bathing, a room for washing with warm and hot water, and finally a room for dry steam and wet bath.

Finnish sauna 

The Russian banya is the closest relative of the Finnish sauna. In modern Russian, a sauna is often called a "Finnish banya", though possibly only to distinguish it from other ethnic high-temperature bathing facilities such as Turkish baths referred to as "Turkish banya".  Sauna, with its ancient history amongst Nordic and Uralic peoples, is a source of national pride for Finns.

Swedish Bastu
The Swedish Bastu is derived from the words Bad (bath) and stuga (cabin).
Bastu began to be popular in cities in the Middle Ages. Due to many bastu in the cities, they were banned for a few years.
Swedes enjoyed bathing around Christmasit was popular during the 16th century and 17th centuries. Swedish sauna buildings used to dry meat and grains were used to bathe in. 
It is common to see bastu in sports venues, gyms, swimming  pools and arenas. In public bastu, for example in swimming pools, the bastu are separated for each gender but in private they can be mixed.

Turkish hammam 

The hammam (Turkish saunas / baths) are often as glamorous as Roman baths. A visitor who enters the bathhouse finds himself in a spacious hall, where he leaves his clothes and then proceeds down the stairs and through a long narrow corridor to the soap room. In this room he sees several niches for bathing and three narrow doors leading to steam bath, to a cooler room, and to the hall for resting. This is the order of the bathing procedure. Only after having completed it, one goes to a masseur. The source of steam is a gigantic tub of water inside the wall. The steam goes through a hole in the wall. Moreover, the entire bath is heated by hot air, coming through a special pipe located under a marble floor. The bather lies on the hot stone and sweats. When sweating is plentiful, massage starts.

Sweat lodges in the Americas 

In North America, the use of sweat lodges by Native Americans is similar in concept to the smoke saunas of Finland or the black banya and was recorded as early as 1643. There is evidence of the use of sweat lodges in Mesoamerica before the European arrival, such as the Temazcal which is still used in some regions of Mexico and Central America.

See also 
 Public bathing
 Destination spa
 Hot tub
 Steam shower
 Bannik

References

External links 

Bathing
Russian culture
Russian inventions
Sauna